The Automotive Technician Accreditation (ATA) is a trade qualification for all facets of automotive repair in the United Kingdom. It is a voluntary scheme (not legally binding) similar to that for electricians run by the NICEIC and similarly, is not government-run.

History
It began in June 2005. It was introduced because the level of complexity required to maintain cars needed more competent technicians, from ATA-registered garages. 

Around 25,000 mechanics are ATA-registered.

Management
It is run by IMI Awards Ltd - IMIAL, a not-for-profit organisation that is part of the Institute of the Motor Industry (formerly Automotive Skills), based in Brickendon, Hertfordshire near Bayford railway station south of Hertford. They maintain a register of ATA qualified technicians. The IMI is the main national training organisation for automotive mechanics in the UK. The accreditations are a part of the (national) Qualifications and Credit Framework. IMIAL has around 21 full-time staff at its head office. IMIAL is a member of the Federation of Awarding Bodies IMIAL also maintains close contact with the Qualifications and Curriculum Development Agency.

Examination
Technicians are trained at over 500 approved centres (FE colleges and commercial training organisations) around Britain. Each set of practical tests for each type of accreditation takes around a day, with an online test (for simplicity of marking). It takes place at an IMI Awards Ltd centre.

See also
 Society of Motor Manufacturers and Traders
 Retail Motor Industry Federation
 Good Garage Scheme

References

External links

 Automotive Technician Accreditation
 Companies employing ATA technicians
 Institute of the Motor Industry
 IMI Awards
 Autocity (IMI)

News items
 Garages in August 2010

Video clips
 YouTube channel
 Explanation of the scheme
 Customer confidence

Motor vehicle maintenance
Automotive technologies
Mechanics (trade)
Vocational education in the United Kingdom
Accreditation
2005 establishments in England